Wang Zhenhe (Wang Chen-ho, Timothy Tsen-ho Wang, 王禎和) (1 October 1940 – 3 September 1990) was one of Taiwan's most famous writers. Wang's masterpiece is the comic novel Rose, Rose, I Love you(《玫瑰﹐玫瑰我愛你》), which is set in the coastal town of Hualien during the Vietnam War. The novel's plot centers on the efforts of the town's leaders to come together to set up a brothel to entertain a group of American GIs coming to Taiwan for R&R. Wang is considered the foremost representative of the "nativist literature movement" (鄉土文學運動) that swept Taiwan in the 1970s and 80s.

Selected works in translation

References

Taiwanese male novelists
1940 births
1990 deaths
People from Hualien County
National Taiwan University alumni
20th-century novelists
International Writing Program alumni
20th-century male writers